DMPX (3,7-dimethyl-1-propargylxanthine) is a caffeine analog which displays affinity to A2 adenosine receptors, in contrast to the A1 subtype receptors. DMPX had 28× and 15× higher potency than caffeine in blocking peripheral and central NECA-responses. The locomotor stimulation caused by DMPX (ED50 10 μmol/kg) was similarly higher than caffeine.

See also
 DPCPX
 8-PT
 CPX (8-CPT)
 8-Chlorotheophylline
 Theophylline

References

Adenosine receptor antagonists
Anxiogenics
Caffeine
Designer drugs
Vasoconstrictors
Propargyl compounds